Leopard was the fifth of six Type 24 torpedo boats built for the German Navy (initially called the Reichsmarine and then renamed as the Kriegsmarine in 1935) during the 1920s. The boat made multiple non-intervention patrols during the Spanish Civil War in the late 1930s. During World War II, she played a minor role in the occupation of Bergen during the Norwegian Campaign of April 1940. Leopard was sunk at the end of the month when she was accidentally rammed by a minelayer that she was escorting.

Design and armament
Derived from the preceding Type 23 torpedo boat, the Type 24 was slightly larger and faster, but had a similar armament. Their crew numbered 129 officers and sailors.

As built, the Type 24s mounted three  SK C/28 guns, one forward and two aft of the superstructure, numbered one through three from bow to stern. They carried six above-water 50 cm (19.7 in) torpedo tubes in two triple mounts amidships and could also carry up to 30 mines. After 1931, the torpedo tubes were replaced by  tubes and a pair of  C/30 anti-aircraft guns were added. In 1932 the boat had her 10.5 cm guns replaced by  SK C/34 guns for sea trials prior to their use on the s.

Construction and career

Leopard was laid down at the Reichsmarinewerft Wilhelmshaven (Navy Yard) on 4 May 1927 as yard number 114, launched on 15 March 1928 and commissioned on 1 June 1929. By the end of 1936 she was assigned to the 2nd Torpedo Boat Flotilla and the boat made several deployments to Spain during the Spanish Civil War. Around June 1938, Leopard was transferred to the 4th Torpedo Boat Flotilla.

Spanish Civil War

Second World War
At the beginning of the war, the 4th Flotilla was disbanded and Leopard was transferred to the 6th Torpedo Boat Flotilla where she supported the North Sea mining operations that began on 3 September 1939. On 13, 18 and 19 November, the 6th Flotilla and one or two light cruisers met destroyers returning from minelaying missions off the English coast. Two days later the flotilla made another contraband patrol in the Skagerrak before returning to port on the 25th.

During the Norwegian Campaign, Leopard and Wolf were assigned to Group 3 under Konteradmiral (Rear Admiral) Hubert Schmundt on the light cruiser , tasked to capture Bergen harbor. After loading troops of the invasion force in Cuxhaven, the torpedo boats and the depot ship Carl Peters proceeded independently to rendezvous with the rest of Group 3 on the afternoon of 8 April. Under orders to land his troops before dawn on 9 April, Schmundt's ships entered the Korsfjorden around midnight. They were spotted shortly afterwards by a Norwegian patrol boat which alerted the Norwegian defenses. All ships flashed light signals identifying them as British ships whenever challenged, but the Norwegians were not fooled. Schmundt ordered Leopard to assume the lead just before they entered the Byfjorden leading to Bergen around 04:00. Kvarven Fort opened fire shortly afterwards, and then Hellen Fort, but they made no hits on the leading ships before they moved out of sight into Bergen harbor at 04:13 where they began landing their troops.

Concerned that his small force could be counter-attacked by the numerous British ships reported to be operating in the North Sea and that they were within range of British bombers, Schmundt took Köln, Leopard and Wolf to sea early that evening. The torpedo boats streamed their minesweeping gear and cut the cables of two mines which floated to the surface as they proceeded through the fjords. Worried that he might be intercepted after receiving further reports of British ships off the Norwegian coast, Schmundt took his ships into the Maurangerfjord where they anchored at 02:00. The following morning, the pilot of a Norwegian Marinens Flyvebaatfabrikk M.F.11 floatplane mistook Leopard for a friendly ship, but realized his mistake after landing and was able to escape without damage. Schmundt headed for home as darkness was setting in and reached Wilhelmshaven the following evening. While escorting a group of minelayers returning from laying a minefield in the Skaggerak on 30 April, Leopard was sunk when she was accidentally rammed by the minelayer Preussen.

Notes

Citations

References
 

 
 

 

Type 24 torpedo boats
1928 ships
World War II shipwrecks in the Skagerrak
Ships built in Wilhelmshaven